The Communist Party of Nicaragua (abbr. PCdeN or PCN) is a communist party in Nicaragua. Founded as the Socialist Workers' Party in 1967, the core founding members were Juan Lorio, Augusto Lorío, Elí Altamirano (who later served as the party's secretary general) and Manuel Pérez Estrada, who all had been expelled from the Nicaraguan Socialist Party on 23 April 1967.

The party adopted its current name on 13 December 1970.

The PCdeN was a member of the U.S.-funded National Opposition Union (UNO), a coalition of mostly right-leaning political parties which defeated the Sandinista government in the 1990 general election.

See also 
 Central de Acción y Unificación Sindical

References

Citations

Sources

Books

Journal articles

Further reading 
 

1967 in Nicaragua
Communist parties in Nicaragua
Organizations of the Nicaraguan Revolution
Political parties established in 1967
Political parties in Nicaragua